Frank Nagai (フランク 永井; March 18, 1932 – October 27, 2008) was a Japanese singer. Known for his attractive baritone voice. His real name was Kiyoto Nagai (永井 清人 Nagai Kiyoto).

Life 
Frank Nagai was born in Matsuyama, Miyagi, Japan. He had his major debut in 1954 when he was discovered by composer Tadashi Yoshida (吉田 正). He had many hit songs such as Yurakucho de Aimasho,  Tokyo Night Club, Kimi Koishi, and Omae ni. He also appeared in motion pictures, including the film Nishi Ginza Eki Mae (1958), for which he sang the title song.

He enjoyed immense popularity as a singer in Japan. He is credited with discovering female singer Kazuko Matsuo (松尾 和子), who later became quite famous. The two often sang duets together.

He attempted suicide on October 21, 1985, attempting to hang himself, distressed that his lover bore his illegitimate child. He survived, but was left with permanent brain damage.

Notable songs
 （有楽町で逢いましょう Yūrakuchō de Aimashō） lit. Lovers in Yurakucho a.k.a. Let's Meet in Yurakuchô (1957)
 Nishi Ginza Station square （西銀座駅前 Nishi-ginza ekimae） (1958)
 Tokyo of 3:00AM （東京午前三時 Tokyo Gozen Sanji） (1958)
 Tokyo Night Club （東京ナイト・クラブ Tokyo Night Club） (1959)
 I yearn for you （君恋し Kimi Koishi） (1961)
 For you（おまえに Omae Ni） (1972)
 Kiriko's Tango （霧子のタンゴ Kiriko no Tango）(1962)
 Osaka Roman（大阪ろまん）(1966)
 Sixteen Tons (cover song)

References

1932 births
2008 deaths
20th-century Japanese male singers
20th-century Japanese singers
Enka singers
Japanese jazz singers
Deaths from leukemia
Deaths from cancer in Japan
People from Ōsaki, Miyagi
Musicians from Miyagi Prefecture
Male jazz musicians
People with severe brain damage